Step 2/4 (stylized as step 2/4) is the debut solo extended play (EP) by South Korean singer and actress, Gain, a member from girl group Brown Eyed Girls. With the help of executive producer Jo Yeong-cheol and Lee Min-soo, the album was created with a sexy, spirited, striking and mature theme. It was released on October 8, 2010 and distributed by both Nega Network and LOEN Entertainment. The EP features six tracks in total.

Upon its release, the album quickly became a success, debuting at number two on the Gaon Weekly Albums Chart. It went on to sell approximately 9,700 copies, only after her sophomore release Talk About S (2012). It also received critical acclaim from music critics, praising its strong tango influence and the "distinctive persona", with some called it "one of those unexpected masterpieces that come around only once every often."

Two singles were released from the EP, with the lead single, "Irreversible", became her first massive solo hit. An unreleased track from the album, "Bad Temper", was released as a digital single on December 21, 2010 to modest success.

Background and composition
In 2010, it was announced that the members of girl group Brown Eyed Girls would start their own solo careers, beside their group activities. Following this announcement, Gain was revealed to be the second member to pursue a solo career after Narsha's solo debut.

The album was produced executively by Jo Young-cheol, who would later go on to be the executive producer of her materials, along with collaborators like lyricist Kim Eana and producer Lee Min-soo. The album also featured productions from Ra.D and Saint Binary, who had previously remixed for Brown Eyed Girls' previous hit "Hold the Line". Musically, the album is a K-pop record blended with tango music and dance-pop while focusing on topics such as love, seduction and personal stories.

Singles

"Irreversible"
"Irreversible" is the album's lead track, written by Kim Eana with producer Yoon Sang and Lee Min-soo, who have been working with Brown Eyed Girls for a long time. A dance-pop song combines with tango, it tells the story of a girl trying to keep the relationship with her lover though he is abandoning her. Prior to the release of "Irreversible", two teaser videos were released online. The 10-minute-long music video was premiered on October 8, 2010, followed by a choreography-centered version two days later. The song became her first (and currently her only solo single as a lead artist) to top the Gaon Singles Chart.

"Bad Temper"
Previously an unreleased track during the creation of the album, "Bad Temper" was released digitally, as a Christmas gift to her fans for their supports of her solo debut, on December 21, 2010, with a short video clip using the behind-the-scene cuts from her "Irreversible" music video. The song debuted and peaked at number eleven on the Gaon Singles Chart. It received a R-19 rating due to the lyrics.

Release and promotion
Although originally intended to be released in August 2010, the EP was pushed back to October of that year due to the singer's home group promoting their Japanese debut in August. Prior to the release of the album, two teaser videos for the lead single were revealed online on October 3 and 5, respectively.

Gain made her solo debut stage on Music Bank (KBS) on October 8, 2010, the album's release date, followed by performances on Show! Music Core (MBC) and The Music Trend (SBS), performing the lead track while "Truth" was only seen being performed on Music Bank. She then performed "Irreversible" again for SBS's Love Sharing Concert on November 14.

Track listing

Charts

Awards and nominations

Annual music awards

Music program awards

Release history

See also
 List of number-one hits of 2010 (South Korea)

Footnotes

References

External links
 
 

2010 EPs
Pop albums by South Korean artists
Gain (singer) albums
Kakao M EPs